"I'm a Man" is a rock song written by Steve Winwood and record producer Jimmy Miller. It was first recorded in 1967 by the Spencer Davis Group, in which Winwood sang lead vocals and played keyboards. The song was a hit in the United Kingdom and the United States, reaching No. 9 and No. 10, respectively. It has been recorded by many other performers over the years, most successfully by Chicago, whose version charted at No. 8 in the UK in 1970 and No. 49 in the US in 1971.

Original song
The original recording was a Hammond organ-driven blues rock track released as a single by the Spencer Davis Group in early 1967, reaching number nine in the UK Singles Chart. In the US, it peaked at number 10 in the US Billboard Hot 100, as well as number 48 in the magazine's Top Selling R&B Singles. It was the last hit single by the band before the brothers Steve and Muff Winwood left to pursue their own separate careers. The is included on the band's 1967 album, I'm a Man.

Chicago version

Chicago (then known as Chicago Transit Authority) recorded a cover version of "I'm a Man" for their 1969 debut album, The Chicago Transit Authority. When the band's popularity surged after their second album, "I'm a Man" was released as the B-side to a re-release of "Questions 67 and 68". 

Radio stations ended up playing both sides, and "I'm a Man" reached No. 49 on the U.S. Billboard Hot 100 chart in 1971.  In the UK, it reached No. 8 and No. 13 in Ireland.

Chicago personnel:
 Terry Kath – lead vocals (first verse), backing vocals, guitar
 Peter Cetera – lead vocals (second verse), backing vocals, bass
 Robert Lamm – lead vocals (third verse), backing vocals, keyboards
 Danny Seraphine – drums, maracas
 Jimmy Pankow – cowbell, trombone
 Lee Loughnane – claves, trumpet
 Walt Parazaider – tambourine, tenor saxophone

Other cover versions
Italian-American band Macho recorded a 17-minute disco version of the song in 1978, based loosely off of the Chicago arrangement. A shortened version was released as a single, and reached the top 10 of the Billboard Disco Action chart.
Yugoslav rock band Siluete recorded a version of the song in 1967 for the Yugoslav TV show Koncert za ludi mladi svet (A Concert for Young Crazy World). The video for the song was shot in the Wild West town settings in the Avala Film Studios.
In 1987, Italian producer Gianfranco Bortolotti released a medley under his Club House alias, with "I'm a Man" being mixed with Mory Kanté's "Yé ké yé ké". In 1989 the single was licensed to Music Man Records in the UK and became a small hit peaking at number 69 in the British charts.

VW Polo advertisement
Volkswagen aired a UK television commercial titled "Dog" in late winter 2008, which featured a dog miming singing "I'm a Man". The version used in the advertisement for the Polo was a cover version by a young British singer-songwriter, Charlie Winston. The Noam Murro-directed advert was banned after complaints from the RSPCA and over 750 viewers.

References

External links
[ Review of "I'm a Man"] by Richie Unterberger at AllMusic

1967 singles
1971 singles
The Spencer Davis Group songs
Chicago (band) songs
Songs written by Steve Winwood
Song recordings produced by Jimmy Miller
Song recordings produced by James William Guercio
Fontana Records singles
United Artists Records singles
Columbia Records singles
1967 songs